Brian Carney may refer to:

 Brian Carney (cricketer) (born 1931), Australian cricketer
 Brian Carney (editorialist), American journalist 
 Brian Carney (rugby) (born 1976), Irish rugby league and rugby union footballer
 Brian Carney (actor), American actor and son of actor Art Carney